Ellen Walker Craig-Jones (19062000) was an American politician. She was inducted into the Ohio Women's Hall of Fame for "Government and Military Service." She was the first African American woman to be elected mayor of a United States municipality in 1972. She served as mayor of Urbancrest, Ohio, from 1972 until 1975.

Life
In 1960, Craig-Jones embarked on a political career and became a member of the Urbancrest Village Council. In 1971, Craig-Jones was elected Mayor of Urbancrest, Ohio, the first African American woman to be elected mayor by popular vote, and the first African American woman to be elected mayor of a municipality in the United States. Upon taking office in 1972, Craig-Jones focused on modernizing the community. During her administration, Urbancrest received a three million dollar housing project for the town's poorer citizens. Craig-Jones also improved street lighting, installed signage, and repaired Urbancrest's streets. She remained in office until 1975.

She dedicated her life to improving conditions in her hometown of Urbancrest. At various points in her life, Craig-Jones founded or was a member of the Urbancrest Volunteer Civic Improvement Association, the Buckeye Boys Ranch, and the Urbancrest Chapter of the Blue Star Mothers of America. She was also actively involved with the Urbancrest Youth Council, the Urbancrest Community Recreation Club, and the Mid-Ohio Regional Planning Commission.

Ellen Walker Craig-Jones died on January 23, 2000, at the age of 93.

References 

African-American mayors in Ohio
Women mayors of places in Ohio
1906 births
2000 deaths
20th-century American politicians
20th-century American women politicians
20th-century African-American women
20th-century African-American politicians